"Second superpower" is a term used to conceptualize a global civil society as a world force comparable to or counterbalancing the United States of America. The term originates from a 2003 New York Times article which described world public opinion as one of two superpowers.

It has also been applied to the USSR in the past, and to China, a rising power in the 21st century.

Peace movement in opposition to invasion of Iraq

Invention in response to February 2003 demonstrations 

On February 15, 2003, global demonstrations took place against the impending invasion of Iraq. These involved between six and thirty million people and were listed in the Guinness Book of World Records as including the largest anti-war rally in history. In reaction, New York Times writer Patrick Tyler wrote in a February 17 article that:

Popularization as a description of popular opinion 
The New York Times article was widely circulated in the peace movement during February 2003, adding to the hope among many participants that galvanizing world public opinion could prevent the Iraq War.

UN Secretary General Kofi Annan began to use the phrase "two superpowers" in speeches. In March, "The Nation" magazine cover story was titled "The Other Superpower". In it, Jonathan Schell wrote:

Though worldwide popular opposition failed to prevent the invasion of Iraq, leading some to reject the notion, the phrase is still popular among people in the anti-war and anti-globalization movements.

Internet-based activism 
On March 31, 2003, Dr. James F. Moore of Harvard Law School's Berkman Center for Internet and Society posted an essay entitled The Second Superpower Rears Its Beautiful Head. In it, he advocated four ideas: embrace the concept explicitly within the peace movement as an inspirational goal and a counter to the "first superpower" idea promoted by the Bush administration, continue to develop blogging and other means of linking the community globally, find ways to influence first superpower institutions including international institutions and international law, and continue to develop reflective personal consciousness so as to be able to lead from love rather than fear.

This paper received 50,000 downloads in five days. The substance of the piece was debated by a number of authors, including Jonathan Rauch writing in National Journal. Many bloggers linked the paper with Joi Ito's Emergent Democracy concept and paper.

Some attacked Moore's use of the term to describe primarily the effect of the Internet. Brian Fitzgerald argued in the Greenpeace Weblog:

"Googlewashing" 
Moore's paper was the subject of an attack on the dissemination process and the relationship of the author and his reviewers to Google, by Andrew Orlowski of The Register. Orlowski accused a small number of webloggers of "Googlewashing", a word Orlowski invented to describe media manipulation of Google to neuter the political significance of the word. He argued:

Other states

Soviet Union 
During the cold war era the term was heavily applied to Union of Soviet Socialist Republics, as the USSR was a power of comparable influence, but lagged behind the US in economy and wealth.

China 

In the 21st century, the term has also been applied by scholars and geopolitical observer to the possibility that the People's Republic of China could emerge as a "second superpower," with global power and influence on par with the United States.

The term is also used by Tony Blair.

See also
eGovernment
Great power
Group of Two
Hyperpower
Internet activism
Peace movement
Potential superpowers
Power (international relations)
Superpower

References

External links
New York Times: "A New Power in the Streets"
Greenpeace: "The Second Superpower Rears is Beautiful Head"
James Moore, "The Second Superpower"
Andrew Orlowski's "Anti-war slogan coined, repurposed and Googlewashed… in 42 days"
Joan Hinton: The Second Superpower (Beijing International Peace Vigil)
Professor Geoffrey Nunberg's New York Times feature, As Google Goes, So Goes the Nation, reprinted in Going Nucular (Public Affairs, 2004)
Pierre Lazuly's "Telling Google What To Think, Le Monde Diplomatique

Internet-based activism
Community organizing
Technology in society
Power (international relations)
Superpowers